Club Deportivo Vasco (usually called Vasco) was a professional football club. The club has won one First Division title in the amateur era. The club is based in Caracas.

Honours
Primera División Venezolana: 1
Winners (1): 1954

External links
Vasco 

Football clubs in Venezuela
Football clubs in Caracas
Defunct football clubs in Venezuela